José Guzmán (born 1963) is a Puerto Rican baseball player.

José Guzmán may also refer to:

 José Guzmán (basketball) (born 1937), Peruvian Olympic basketball player
 José Guzmán (boxer) (born 1963), Venezuelan boxer
 José Guzmán Santos (born 1947), Mexican politician
 José Florencio Guzmán (1929–2017), Chilean politician
 José de Guzmán Benítez (1857–1921), Mayor of Ponce, Puerto Rico
 José de Guzmán, 1st Viscount of San Rafael de la Angostura (1740–1792), Dominican cattle rancher, colonizer and nobleman

See also
 Juan José Guzmán (1800–1847), President of El Salvador (1842–1844)
 José Rocchi Guzmán (born 1988), Mexican football goalkeeper